Anthony Irvine Adams AM is an Australian public health physician. He was the Australian Chief Medical Officer between 1988 and 1997.

Biography

Early life
Anthony Adams studied medicine at the University of Adelaide graduating in 1959. He undertook postgraduate studies at Harvard School of Public Health obtaining a Master of Public Health (MPH) degree in 1961.

While in the USA in 1962 he attended the annual meeting of the American Public Health Association in Miami and was so inspired that he resolved to start a Public Health Association in Australia. He worked at the School of Public Health in Sydney as senior lecturer in 1964.

Career
In Australia at that time there was a New South Wales Public Health Association and a Western Australia Public Health Association plus the Queensland Society for Health but no national body. There was also no academic organization to coordinate public health research in the country.

In 1968 he convened a meeting to establish the Australian (later Australian and New Zealand Society) for Research in Community Health and finally formed the Australian Public Health Association.

In 1969 he was secretary of both organizations. He made sure that Australia joined the World Federation of Public Health Associations.
He was Chief Health Officer in NSW, and Chief Medical Officer for Australia (1988–1997) and then Professor of Public Health at the Australian National University.

He led the Australian delegation to the World Health Assembly and the Western Pacific World Health Organization meetings for many years and in 2010 was still Chair of the Global Commission for the Certification of the Eradication of Poliomyelitis - the largest public health program in history. 

He is a Fellow of the Australasian Faculty of Public Health Medicine, Fellow of the Royal Australasian College of Physicians, a Fellow of the Royal Australasian College of Medical Administrators, a Fellow of the Public Health Association of Australia and a Fellow of the American Public Health Association. 

In 2001 he retired to Avoca Beach, New South Wales, but is still involved in local public health issues such as getting the benefits of fluoridated water to the last remaining areas in the state.

Honours
He was made a Member of the Order of Australia in the 1998 Queen's Birthday Honours for "service to the community in the field of epidemiology and to the public health, particularly through public health policy development and program delivery".

In 2001 he was awarded the Harvard School of Public Health Alumni Award of Merit for a "distinguished service in public health practice".

In 2020 he received the Sidney Sax Public Health Medal from the Public Health Association of Australia for his notable contribution to the protection and promotion of public health.

References 

Members of the Order of Australia
People from the Australian Capital Territory
Australian public health doctors
Harvard School of Public Health alumni
Living people
Year of birth missing (living people)
University of Adelaide Medical School alumni